Kevin Taylor (born 10 August 1963) is a British boxer. He competed in the men's featherweight event at the 1984 Summer Olympics.

Amateur record
Taylor won the 1984 Amateur Boxing Association British featherweight title, when boxing out of the Middleton & Rochdale ABC. He then represented Great Britain at the 1984 Olympic Games in the featherweight division.

Professional record

References

External links
 

1963 births
Living people
British male boxers
Olympic boxers of Great Britain
Boxers at the 1984 Summer Olympics
Sportspeople from Rochdale
Featherweight boxers